Im Che (1549 – 1587) was a literate Confucianist Yangban in Joseon.

Works 

Im penned the following sijo upon the death of famed gisaeng, Hwang Jini.

The following two poems were exchanged between Im Che and his lover, gisaeng Hanu (한우; 寒雨). Im was known for his liaisons with Hanu and Hwang Jin Yi. The term in line 3, ch'an bi (찬비), literally translates as "freezing rain." It uses the same Chinese characters as the poetess' name (寒雨), but with a different pronunciation, and was intended by both poets as a pun. 

Hanu's particular gift is to echo the style of the original that Im wrote to her, while improving on it with a teasing, very human tone. The translation employs a formal tone to match Im's original; and then follows with the simpler and more lyric style used by Hanu. In both cases, the line "rain has frozen" seemed to best communicate the double entendre of the originals.

When about to die, he grieved and left the words below.

Kō Bun'yū introduce this line as Im Che's indignation because in the history, this is not only barbarians outside of the Great Wall, but even Tibetans from southwest conquered Chinese world once, or occupied the capital and threatened the city, however only Korea never even became a threaten to China. What Korea do is to treat Great China with the utmost courtesy and show loyalty to father.

References 

Korean Confucianists
16th-century scholars
1549 births
1587 deaths
16th-century Korean poets